Elections to the French National Assembly were held in French Dahomey on 17 June 1951. The territory elected two seats to the Assembly, which were won by Sourou-Migan Apithy of the List of the French Union and Hubert Maga of the Ethnic Group of the North. Voter turnout was 44.3%.

Results

References

Elections in Benin
Dahomey
1951 in French Dahomey
Legislative elections in France